Gyan Chand Jain (1923-2007) was an Indian writer and scholar of Urdu literature.  Born in 1923 at Seohara of Bijnore district in the Indian state of Uttar Pradesh, Jain was known for his scholarship on Ghalib literature. He authored several books including Aik Bhasha: Do Likhawat, Do Adab and Urdu Ki Nasri Dastanain, the latter considered by many as his masterpiece. 

Jain received the Sahitya  Akademi Award for Urdu in 1982. He was honored by the Government of India, in 2002, with the fourth highest Indian civilian award of Padma Shri He died, aged 85, in August 2007 at Porterville, California.

See also

 Urdu literature

References

External links
 
 

Recipients of the Padma Shri in literature & education
1923 births
2007 deaths
Scholars from Uttar Pradesh
Poets from Uttar Pradesh
People from Bijnor district
Urdu-language poets from India
20th-century Indian poets
Recipients of the Sahitya Akademi Award in Urdu